In Greek mythology, Clymenus (means "notorious" or "renowned") may refer to multiple individuals:

Clymenus, a son of Phoroneus by either Cerdo or Teledice or Cinna. He and his sister Chthonia founded a sanctuary of Demeter.
Clymenus was the son of Helios and king of Boeotia. In a variant genealogy, he is the father of the children of the Oceanid Merope (usually said to be the offspring of Helios and Clymene). These include Phaëton and the Heliades: Merope, Helie, Aegle, Lampetia, Phoebe, Aetherie, and Dioxippe. Sometimes Phaethousa is included in this number. The names "Clymenus" and "Merope" in Hyginus' version, which is not followed otherwise, may have resulted from incidental gender swap of the names of the Oceanid Clymene and her mortal husband Merops.
Clymenus, who killed Hodites during the fight between Phineus and Perseus.
Clymenus, son of Cardys and a descendant of Heracles of Ida. He became king of Olympia but was deposed by Endymion. He was credited with founding the temple of Athena Cydonia in Phrixa, Elis.
Clymenus, a Calydonian prince as the son of King Oeneus and Althaea, daughter of King Thestius of Pleuron. He was the brother of Meleager, Periphas, Agelaus (or Ageleus), Thyreus (or Phereus or Pheres), Deianeira, Gorge, Eurymede and Melanippe. When the war between the Curetes and the Calydonians broke out, Clymenus along with his brothers, including Meleager, all fell during the battle.
Clymenus or Periclymenus, son of either Presbon or Orchomenus (in the latter case, brother of Aspledon and Amphidocus) and a King of Orchomenus in Boeotia, which he inherited from its eponym Orchomenus - either as his son, or (in the version that makes him a son of Presbon) because Orchomenus left the kingdom to him, having no children of his own. By Boudeia or Bouzyge, daughter of Lycus, Clymenus was father of five sons: Erginus, Stratius, Arrhon, Pyleus, Azeus, and two daughters: Eurydice and Axia. At a festival of Poseidon at Onchestus, Clymenus quarreled with a group of Thebans over a minor cause and was mortally wounded as a result of a stone thrown at him by Perieres, the charioteer of Menoeceus. Being brought home half dead, Clymenus told Erginus, his successor-to-be, to avenge his death, and died; Erginus then led a war against Thebes.
Clymenus, king of Arcadia, was the son of either Schoeneus or Teleus. He committed incest with his daughter Harpalyce which prompted him to commit suicide afterwards. Clymenus' sons were Idas and Therager. He was also said to have eaten in a banquet the flesh of his sons by his own daughter Harpalyce.
Clymenus, one of the Argonauts, and the brother of Iphiclus. He was probably son of Phylacus and Clymene and thus brother of Alcimede, mother of Jason.
Clymenus, one of the sons of King Aeolus of Lipara, the keeper of the winds. He had five brothers namely: Periphas, Agenor, Euchenor, Xouthos and Macareus, and six sisters: Klymene, Kallithyia, Eurygone, Lysidike, Kanake and an unnamed one. According to various accounts, Aeolus yoked in marriage his sons, including Clymenus, and daughters in order to preserve concord and affection among them.
Clymenus, one of the Suitors of Penelope who came from Dulichium along with other 56 wooers. He, with the other suitors, was shot dead by Odysseus with the help of Eumaeus, Philoetius, and Telemachus.
Clymenus, a surname of Hades.

Notes

References 

 Antoninus Liberalis, The Metamorphoses of Antoninus Liberalis translated by Francis Celoria (Routledge 1992). Online version at the Topos Text Project.
 Apollodorus, The Library with an English Translation by Sir James George Frazer, F.B.A., F.R.S. in 2 Volumes, Cambridge, MA, Harvard University Press; London, William Heinemann Ltd. 1921. ISBN 0-674-99135-4. Online version at the Perseus Digital Library. Greek text available from the same website.
 Athenaeus of Naucratis, The Deipnosophists or Banquet of the Learned. London. Henry G. Bohn, York Street, Covent Garden. 1854. Online version at the Perseus Digital Library.
 Athenaeus of Naucratis, Deipnosophistae. Kaibel. In Aedibus B.G. Teubneri. Lipsiae. 1887. Greek text available at the Perseus Digital Library.
 Gaius Julius Hyginus, Fabulae from The Myths of Hyginus translated and edited by Mary Grant. University of Kansas Publications in Humanistic Studies. Online version at the Topos Text Project.
 Gaius Valerius Flaccus, Argonautica translated by Mozley, J H. Loeb Classical Library Volume 286. Cambridge, MA, Harvard University Press; London, William Heinemann Ltd. 1928. Online version at theio.com.
 Gaius Valerius Flaccus, Argonauticon. Otto Kramer. Leipzig. Teubner. 1913. Latin text available at the Perseus Digital Library.
 Hesiod, Catalogue of Women from Homeric Hymns, Epic Cycle, Homerica translated by Evelyn-White, H G. Loeb Classical Library Volume 57. London: William Heinemann, 1914. Online version at theio.com
Homer, The Odyssey with an English Translation by A.T. Murray, PH.D. in two volumes. Cambridge, MA., Harvard University Press; London, William Heinemann, Ltd. 1919. . Online version at the Perseus Digital Library. Greek text available from the same website.
 Parthenius, Love Romances translated by Sir Stephen Gaselee (1882-1943), S. Loeb Classical Library Volume 69. Cambridge, MA. Harvard University Press. 1916.  Online version at the Topos Text Project.
 Parthenius, Erotici Scriptores Graeci, Vol. 1. Rudolf Hercher. in aedibus B. G. Teubneri. Leipzig. 1858. Greek text available at the Perseus Digital Library.
 Pausanias, Description of Greece with an English Translation by W.H.S. Jones, Litt.D., and H.A. Ormerod, M.A., in 4 Volumes. Cambridge, MA, Harvard University Press; London, William Heinemann Ltd. 1918. . Online version at the Perseus Digital Library
 Pausanias, Graeciae Descriptio. 3 vols. Leipzig, Teubner. 1903.  Greek text available at the Perseus Digital Library.
 Publius Ovidius Naso, Metamorphoses translated by Brookes More (1859-1942). Boston, Cornhill Publishing Co. 1922. Online version at the Perseus Digital Library.
 Publius Ovidius Naso, Metamorphoses. Hugo Magnus. Gotha (Germany). Friedr. Andr. Perthes. 1892. Latin text available at the Perseus Digital Library.
 Strabo, The Geography of Strabo. Edition by H.L. Jones. Cambridge, Mass.: Harvard University Press; London: William Heinemann, Ltd. 1924. Online version at the Perseus Digital Library.
 Strabo, Geographica edited by A. Meineke. Leipzig: Teubner. 1877. Greek text available at the Perseus Digital Library.
Tzetzes, John, Allegories of the Odyssey translated by Goldwyn, Adam J. and Kokkini, Dimitra. Dumbarton Oaks Medieval Library, Harvard University Press, 2015. 

Family of Athamas
Argonauts
Kings of Minyan Orchomenus
Kings in Greek mythology
Princes in Greek mythology
Suitors of Penelope
Aetolian characters in Greek mythology
Minyan characters in Greek mythology
Thessalian characters in Greek mythology
Suicides in Greek mythology
Children of Helios
Incest in Greek mythology